Edward Lombe may refer to:
 Edward Lombe (MP) (c. 1800–1852), British MP for Arundel
 Edward Lombe (1828), a merchantman and passenger ship built in 1828